Parvatibai Chowgule College of Arts & Science is Goa's first and only autonomous college with NAAC A+ Grade college based in the South Goa district Headquarters of Margao, on the west coast of India.

History

Shri.Vishwasraw.D.Chowgule, an industrialist and philanthropist, set up the initiative for offering higher education to Goan youth, immediately after liberation in 1962.

Parvatibai Chowgule College is accredited by NAAC with a Grade 'A+' (CGPA of 3.27 on a four-point scale on the fourth cycle), it was adjudged Best Affiliated College by Goa University at its Silver Jubilee celebrations in 2009 and was given the Best Educational Institute award by in 2014. Having been conferred the autonomous status by University Grants Commission in June 2014, this is the first Autonomous College in the State of Goa.

In 2017, the college was awarded the 'DBT Star College Scheme' by the Department of Biotechnology (DBT), Ministry of Science and Technology, Government of India, being the first college in Goa to receive grants under this prestigious scheme. Our college is honored with the 'Best Internship Partner' award by Goa Rugby Union at the Goa Rugby Awards 2018. Our College is categorized as a 'Band A' institution (Rank between 06 and 25) in the category of "Institutes and Colleges (Govt. and Govt. Aided)" in Atal Ranking of Institutions on Innovation Achievement(ARIIA) 2020 announced by MHRD, Government of India, in 2020. We have also been rated '4.5 Star' for undertaking various activities prescribed by Innovation Cell, the Ministry of Education, Government of India to promote innovation and start-ups on the campus during the IIC calendar year 2019–2020.

In the National Institutional Ranking Framework conducted by the Ministry of Human Resource Development Govt of India for colleges across the country, our college was ranked in the Rank Band of 101–150 in the year 2018, followed subsequently by being in the Rank Band of 151–200 in the years 2019 and 2021.

Academic programmes

Undergraduate degrees
Bachelor of Arts [B.A]
English, French, Hindi, Konkani, Marathi, Mathematics, Economics, Geography, History, Philosophy, Psychology, and Sociology
Bachelor of Science [B.Sc]
Biochemistry, Biotechnology, Botany, Chemistry, Computer Science, Geography, Geology, Mathematics, Physics, and Zoology
Bachelor of Vocational Education [B.Voc]
B.Voc in Software development 
B.Voc in Multimedia – Digital Filmmaking
B.Voc in 3D Media & Virtual Reality (VFX)

Postgraduate degrees
Postgraduate diploma in computer application
Master of Arts [M.A]
M.A. in Geography
M.A. in Applied economics
M.A. in Child psychology and Child development
M.A. in Hindi
M.A. in English
Master of Science [M.Sc]
M.Sc Analytical chemistry
M.Sc Geoinformatics
M.Sc Information technology

It is the only institution in Goa, India to offer a master's degree (M.A.) in child psychology. It is also one of the very few colleges in Goa to offer geology as a Bachelor of Science course.[1]

Short term certification courses

Diploma and certificate programmes
Aviation Hospitality & Customer service
Dual Certification Program Food and Beverage Service with Bartending
Room Division
Drawing & Painting
Motion graphics
Photography
Raster graphics
Vector graphics
Video editing
Videography

Other programs

International student and teachers exchange programmes
The college has an ongoing international student-teacher exchange program with institutions of higher learning in Sweden, Japan, and Portugal. Under these exchange programs, students from the college visit these institutes to learn about the education, culture and experience the unique hospitality that the families of students there have to offer. Similarly, students from these institutes visit our college and undergo a similar program in India.

Student Support Services Department
This college extends support to students in various activities required for a well-developed academic life. The student Support Services department ensures that students receive friendly and easily accessible guidance and support. 
The Student Support Services provides a host of specialized services to students, which are aimed at developing the well-round personality of the students, offering them counseling on academic and non-academic concerns.

Facilities

Library

The library has worldwide links, giving end-users access to scholarly material that is relevant and regularly updated. It subscribes to 75 latest scientific as well as general journals. The specialist collection includes books, extensive reference materials, AV materials, rare photo collections, etc. More than 2700 bound volumes are also available.

Laboratories
Department labs: physics, botany, biotechnology, biochemistry, computer science, zoology, chemistry, geography, geology, and psychology departments are equipped with modern laboratories that have provisions for research facilities.
Computer labs: The college has computer labs for the use of staff and students.
Research Laboratory: The college houses a centralized research laboratory equipped with modern equipment.

Writing Centre
The Writing Centre at Parvatibai Chowgule College was founded with the help of International experts to teach, develop, and improve the students' writing skills. The writing center aims to develop the students' academic writing skills and provides assistance and help with other forms of writing required by students and faculty in the general academic atmosphere.

Career and Personal Counselling Centre
To help students to make a well-researched choice of careers, the Career and Personal Counseling Centre offers a range of counseling solutions such as Vocational Guidance (aptitude testing) and career Counseling. Personal counseling with a personal counselor is also available to tide over personal issues and concerns. The center aims at developing a career plan for students by helping them to connect with their field of study to different occupational alternatives, create a post-graduate educational plan and explore job opportunities.

School of Foreign Languages
School of Foreign Languages at Parvatibai Chowgule College of Arts and Science promotes foreign language learning and culture. Experts and native speakers conduct the following foreign language course for the students and public at the college.	Portuguese language courses for basic, elementary, and intermediate levels are conducted and certificates are issued by Instituto Camoes, Portugal.

The Tiger Studio
The college is the first educational institution in Goa to have a full-fledged studio for pre & post-production of videos for film and television. The studio is well equipped with HD Cameras, Crane, Professional Indoor & Outdoor Lights, MAC and Windows workstations, and professionally soundproofed areas.
Tiger Studio runs several short-term and advanced courses in Video-Editing, Animation, Sound-Editing, Photography, Videography, Special Effects, and many more.

Physical Fitness Center and Rehabilitation & Sports Medicine Centre
Spread over 35000 Square feet, the center is equipped with a sports and recreational fitness facility, featuring cardio equipment, selector machines, Iso-kinetic machines, free weights, an indoor running track, and plyometrics platforms, dot drill mats, and Olympic platforms. These are useful to a wide range of users ranging from elite athletes to recreational gym-goers.
The sports medicine center is designed to cater to all sportspersons and others suffering from musculoskeletal ailments.  It is equipped with an x-ray unit to conduct thorough diagnostics of the athletes and other individuals seeking pain-relieving modalities.  The center also has a hydrotherapy pool to treat athletes and others who are suffering from injuries to the lower extremities.

Translation Centre
The Translation Centre was inaugurated in 2017 and is the first of its kind in Goa. The objective of the center is to promote the growth of indigenous literature and knowledge, thereby inducting the students into the field of translation and assignment of translation work.

Centre for Teaching and Learning
The Centre for Teaching and Learning was inaugurated in November 2017 and is the first in the State of Goa and one of the few Centres in the country. This Centre aims to educate faculty on how to go about integrating ICT in Higher Education effectively by conducting workshops, seminars and providing them with hands-on experience/training, innovation, implementation, and sharing of different ICT tools in teaching like Simulation, Gamification, LMS, Mobile Applications, etc. and develop E-content for the various courses offered by the college and other educational institutions, conduct research related to use of ICT, Learning Analytics, Mobiles, LMS, etc. and provide Assessment/Evaluation strategies to track student progression until graduation.

Athletics
Chowgule Sports and Fitness Center is in the south of Goa on a sprawling  property.

In 2007, the campus inaugurated its exclusive Wi-Fi network, which promoted e-learning as well set up online courses called Chowgules Learn Anytime Any Place (CLAAP), which helped students get course material online and have discussions in forums.

Student activities
The bonafide students of the college can earn six non-evaluative credits in extracurricular activities by joining a student-governed club.  The office of students affairs offers membership in various student-governed clubs throughout the academic year.

Tathastu is the annual inter-collegiate event organized by Chowgule College and has seen increasing participation over the years. Other annual activities carried out in the academic field include subject-day celebrations when activities like quizzes, debates, poster-making, etc. are held. A few prominent events like Pegasus (English Department), Nebula (Geology Department), Revelations (Economics Department), I-RIX (Computer Science Department), Geographize (Geography Department) etc. are well known in Goa and surrounding states. Pegasus is the first undergraduate English literary festival in Goa and has completed 10 years since its inception in 2008. Geographize, which enables students to
showcase their geographical skills through various events, was first held in 2012, and has since become a national event.

The tiger is the official mascot of the college and the students are regarded as "Chowgule Tigers".

In April 2010, a sequence of the film Golmaal 2 was shot on the Chowgule College Campus.

The Founder's day celebration at the college has invited prominent chief guests like Chetan Bhagat (2010), Nandita Das (2011), Milkha Singh (2014), Viswanathan Anand(2012) Viren Rasquinha (2015) and Terence Lewis (choreographer) (2016).

See also 
 Chowgule Sports Centre

References

External links
 Official website of Chowgule College, Margao

Universities and colleges in Goa
Educational institutions established in 1962
Buildings and structures in Margao
Education in South Goa district